The Cherry Girl was an Edwardian musical comedy in two acts based on a book by Seymour Hicks with lyrics by Aubrey Hopwood and music by Ivan Caryll. It opened at the Vaudeville Theatre in London's West End on 21 December 1903. The original cast included Hicks, Constance Hyem, Courtice Pounds and Hicks's wife, Ellaline Terriss. From August 1904, the play went on tour to the Theatre Royal in Glasgow and other British provincial theatres. The play was described as a "children's fairy play", and its story involves a prize to be given by a Fairy Queen for the creation of a statue.

Roles and original cast
The original London cast was as follows:

Act 1
 Moonshine, a White Pierrot – Seymour Hicks
 Starlight, a Black Pierrot – Courtice Pounds
 Bow and Scrape, two chamberlains – Stanley Brett and Murray King
 Esau, Pansy's gorilla – Edward Sillward
 Snowball, a sweep's boy – George Hersee
 Pansy, a cherry seller – Constance Hyem
 Sylvia, Night and Morning, pierretts – Carmen Hill, Katie Vesey and Hilda Anthony
 Dimples, Snowball's sweetheart – Winnie Hall
 Mdlle. Pas Bas, a model – Dorothy Frostick
 Josephine, a pierette maid – Gladys Archbutt
 The Chamberlain – Miss Carrington
 The Queen – Ellaline Terriss

Act 2
 Happy Joe, a knight of the road – Seymour Hicks
 The Squire, of Homewood Hall – Courtice Pounds
 Grab and Snatchem, two beadles – Stanley Brett and Murray King
 Rose of the Riviera, Happy Joe's stable boy – Master Valchera
 White Surrey and Hecuba, his horse and dog – Edward Sillward
 Robin Roy, Robin Me and Robin Anyone, Happy Joe's men – Frank Carroll, Robert Wilkes and William Hay
 Ikestein, his Irish servant – Charles Trevor
 Millicent, Lady of Homewood Hall – Carmen Hill
 Tip-Toe, Happy Joe's wife – Kate Vesey
 The Queen – Ellaline Terriss

Synopsis of scenes and plot
The scenes for both acts are as follows:

Act 1 – Once Upon a Time
 Scene 1 – A street in carnival time (night).
 Scene 2 – On the housetops (Pierrot-land).
 Scene 3 – The throne room of the Queen.
 Scene 4 – Moonshine's studio.
 Scene 5 – Cloudland.
Act 2 – 100 Years Ago
 Scene 1 – A village green in Old England.
 Scene 2 – The gateway of Happy Joe's garden.
 Scene 3 – Happy Joe's purple garden.
 Scene 4 – Moonshine's studio again.

Reviewing the first performance, The Manchester Guardian gave this summary of the plot:

Musical numbers

Act I
1. Chorus – "Revelry riots when Carnival's King"
2. Watchmen and Chorus – "Good folk who here rejoice"
3. Starlight – "Pussy Cats Three"
4. Chorus – "Over the tiles"
5. Moonshine and Chorus – "Telephone to the moon"
6. Chorus – "Hail! Her Majesty"
7. "The Queen and Chorus – Naughty, just for once"
8. Chorus and Dance – "Painting"
9. Sylvia and Chorus – "Bubble Land"
10. Entrance of Picture Buyers
11. Moonshine – "What a pretty picture"
12. The Queen and Moonshine – "In the Studio"
13. Starlight and Chorus – "Pansy"
14. Finale – "Sleep, little Queen, and drift away"

Act II
15. Chorus – "When the birds begin to sing"
16. The Queen – "My little Hong Kong baby"
17. Moonshine – "Did he?"
18. The Queen – "Those loving eyes"
19. The Queen – "Just to please you"
20. The Squire – "Bogeys"
21. Octet – "Dat's the way to spell chicken"
22. Spirit of Dawn – "The coming of Dawn"
23. The Queen – "Miss Innocent"
24. Finale – "God save Her Majesty"
Source: 1903 vocal score.

Following its 100th performance in March 1904, several new songs were introduced:
 "The Little Yellow Bird"
 "Fascinating Frou-Frou of the Frill"
 "When the Stars are Shining in the Sky"

Reception
The Times thought that dramatically the first act was a success, but was much less impressed by the second, though it had "all sorts of pretty, clever and funny things in it." Caryll's music was judged "tuneful enough, but very thin", and too reminiscent of the composer's earlier scores. The paper's anonymous reviewer thought "Bubble Land" the best musical number.  The Manchester Guardian commented:

Recordings
No recordings were released by the original cast. A list of releases by other artists is given below – it includes title, singer, record company and release date (where known):

 "Little Yellow Bird", Flo de Vere, G&T, 1904
 "By the Sycamore Tree", Helen Haydn, G&T, 1904
 "Miss Innocent", Bohemian Band, Edison Bell (cylinder)
 "Navajo", Peter Dawson, Edison Bell
 "Pansy", George Sherwin, Zonophone

References and notes

External links
 Victorian and Edwardian Musical Shows – MIDI simulation of musical numbers from The Cherry Girl

1903 musicals
Original musicals
West End musicals
British musicals